The 2013–14 season were the Foolad's 12th season in the Pro League, and their 6th consecutive season in the top division of Iranian Football. They also be competed in the Hazfi Cup which were knockout in the semi-finals by Tractor Sazi and AFC Champions League in Round of 16 by Al-Sadd. Foolad F.C. was captained by Bakhtiar Rahmani and won the league title at the end of the season.

Key events

Squad

Iran Pro League squad
As of January 14, 2014

 U21 = Under 21 Player
 U23 = Under 23 Player

Loan list

Transfers

In

Out

Pre-season and friendlies

Competition record

Overall

Iran Pro League

Hazfi Cup

AFC Champions League

Group stage

Knockout phase

Note: Al-Sadd won 2–2 on away goals.

Statistics

Top scorers

References

External links
Iran Premier League Statistics

Foolad F.C.
Foolad F.C. seasons